Brian Theodore Tyler (born May 8, 1972) is an American composer, conductor, arranger, and record producer, best known for his film, television, and video game scores. In his 24-year career, Tyler has scored Transformers: Prime, Eagle Eye, The Expendables trilogy, Iron Man 3, Avengers: Age of Ultron with Piotr Olszewski, Now You See Me, and Crazy Rich Asians, among others. He also re-arranged the current fanfare of the Universal Pictures logo, originally composed by Jerry Goldsmith, for Universal Pictures' 100th anniversary, which debuted with The Lorax (2012). He composed the 2013–2016 Marvel Studios logo, which debuted with Thor: The Dark World (2013), which he also composed the film's score. He composed the NFL Sunday Countdown Theme for ESPN and the Formula One theme (also used in Formula 2 and Formula 3). He scored seven installments of the Fast & Furious franchise, and the soundtrack for the Paramount TV series Yellowstone. For his work as a film composer, he won the IFMCA Awards 2014 Composer of the Year.

His composition for the film Last Call earned him the first of three Emmy nominations, a gold record, and induction into the music branch of the Academy of Motion Picture Arts and Sciences. As of November 2017, his films have grossed $12 billion worldwide, putting him in the top 10 highest-grossing film composers of all time.

Life and career 
Tyler was born and raised in Orange County, California. His grandfather was art director Walter H. Tyler. One of his first major influences was his pianist grandmother. He holds a bachelor's degree from the University of California, Los Angeles and a master's from Harvard University. Growing up, he taught himself to play dozens of musical instruments, including drums, piano, guitar, bass, cello, world percussion, synthesizer, charango and bouzouki.

Tyler began scoring features shortly after graduating from Harvard. Robert Kraft, who was impressed with Tyler's music, encouraged him to pursue a career in film scoring. Tyler's first film score was for the independent film Bartender (1997), directed by Gabe Torres. The following year, he and Red Elvises composed the score for Six-String Samurai (1998).

Tyler's breakthrough came in the early 2000s, after composing for Frailty (2001). His work on Last Call (2002) earned him an induction into the music branch of the Academy of Motion Picture Arts and Sciences. Director William Friedkin, impressed with Tyler's work on Frailty, engaged him to compose for The Hunted (2003), which earned Tyler a World Soundtrack Award in 2002 for Best New Film Composer of the Year. Starting in 2003, Tyler began working on big-budget films, including Timeline (2003), Godsend (2004), The Greatest Game Ever Played (2005), and Constantine (2005). His score for The Fast and the Furious: Tokyo Drift (2006) hit No. 1 on the iTunes soundtrack sales charts, and his soundtrack for Children of Dune reached No. 4 on the Amazon.com album charts.. His cues for Children of Dune were used in multiple other theatrical film trailers, including Master and Commander (2003), Sahara (2005), Cinderella Man (2005), The Chronicles of Narnia: The Lion, the Witch and the Wardrobe (2005), Indiana Jones and the Kingdom of the Crystal Skull (2008), and Star Trek (2009). The track "Summon the Worms" was used as a leader for the Dutch show Peking Express, and in the first leaked promotional reel for The Golden Compass (2007).

In 2007, he was hired to compose for Partition (2007), where he integrated Indian and Middle Eastern music with orchestral writing. He conducted the orchestral portion of the score with the Hollywood Studio Symphony in Los Angeles.

On September 5, 2011, Tyler announced that he was in talks to score the 2011 remake of Highlander, and pilot episodes for the animated series Transformers: Prime. He scored four episodes of the latter.

In 2012, Tyler scored a new version of the fanfare of the Universal Pictures logo, originally composed by Jerry Goldsmith, in observance of the studio's 100th anniversary. The new score added a choir, a more majestic arranging style, and a closing drum cadence. It made its debut alongside the logo with The Lorax on March 2, 2012.

In 2013, Tyler composed the fanfare of Marvel Studios, which made its debut alongside the logo with Thor: The Dark World, which he also composed the score of the film, on October 23, 2013, at the Odeon Leicester Square.

Tyler wrote and produced the song "Shell Shocked" with Kill the Noise, Wiz Khalifa, Ty Dolla Sign, Juicy J and Moxie, released in the summer of 2014 under his artist name Madsonik. It reached No. 2 on the iTunes hip-hop singles charts and has sold over 500,000 copies.

On October 12, 2016, Tyler was hired to score the 2017 action-adventure film XXX: Return of Xander Cage. He has also contributed to the soundtrack by his stage name Madsonik, in a collaboration with Tom Morello and Kill The Noise entitled "Divebomb".

On March 2, 2018, he announced on Twitter that he had been hired to write a new theme for Formula One; it was released on March 23. The theme was also used in both Formula 2 and Formula 3 since 2019. In August 2018, a 27-track soundtrack composed by Tyler for the cable TV series Yellowstone was issued in CD format and as an MP3 download on Amazon.

Discography

Theatrical films

Short films

Television film

Television series

Television sports

Video games

Awards and nominations

See also
Music of the Marvel Cinematic Universe

References

External links

 
 

1972 births
21st-century American composers
21st-century American conductors (music)
21st-century American male musicians
21st-century classical composers
American atheists
American classical composers
American electronic musicians
American film score composers
American male classical composers
American male conductors (music)
American male film score composers
American music arrangers
American people of English descent
American people of French descent
American people of German descent
American people of Scottish descent
American television composers
Classical musicians from California
Harvard University alumni
Hollywood Records artists
Living people
La-La Land Records artists
Male television composers
Musicians from Los Angeles
Record producers from California
University of California, Los Angeles alumni
Varèse Sarabande Records artists
Video game composers